Lupinus, commonly known as lupin, lupine, or regionally bluebonnet etc., is a genus of plants in the legume family Fabaceae. The genus includes over 199 species, with centers of diversity in North and South America. Smaller centers occur in North Africa and the Mediterranean. They are widely cultivated, both as a food source and as ornamental plants, but are invasive to some areas.

Description 

Lupins have soft green to grey-green leaves which may be coated in silvery hairs, often densely so. The leaf blades are usually palmately divided into five to 28 leaflets, or reduced to a single leaflet in a few species of the southeastern United States and eastern South America.

The pea-like flowers have an upper standard, or banner, two lateral wings, and two lower petals fused into a keel. The flower shape has inspired common names such as bluebonnets and quaker bonnets.

The fruit is a pod containing several seeds. The seeds contain alkaloids which lend them a bitter taste.

Taxonomy 

The genus Lupinus L. and, in particular, its North American species were divided by Sereno Watson (1873) into three sections: Lupinus, Platycarpos, and Lupinnelus. Differences in habitat and in the number of ovules were the basis for this classification. A majority of the perennial and annual species from the American continent described by Watson were referred to Lupinus. Some annual species with two ovules in the ovary and two seeds in the pod (L. densiflorus, L. microcarpus, etc.) were attributed to the Platycarpos section. Section Lupinnelus consisted of one species (L. uncialis), with axillary and solitary flowers, scarcely reflexed banner, and also with two ovules in the ovary. 

While Watson's work was predominantly based on study of North American species, the later research of Ascherson and Graebner (1907) extended his principle of classification to cover all lupins from the Eastern and Western Hemispheres, also using number of ovules (seedbuds) in the ovary (and thus of seeds in the pod) as the criterion for this division. They described two subgenera, Eulupinus and Platycarpos. Most of the described species were referred to subgen. A. Eulupinus.  Subgen. B. Platycarpos included several annual species from the Eastern Hemisphere with two seedbuds and seeds in the bean (the same species, as the one specified by S. Watson).

A current schema retains this distinction, but uses the nomenclature for the subgenera of Platycarpos and Lupinus. In this schema, subgenus Platycarpos (S.Wats.) Kurl. contains perennial and annual species from the Western Hemisphere, with a minimum two or more ovules or seedbuds. Subgenus Lupinus consists of 12 species from Africa and the Mediterranean, with a minimum of four ovules or seedbuds.

The taxonomy of Lupinus has always been confusing. How many distinct species exist or how they might be organized within the genus is not clear. The plants are variable and the taxa are not always distinct from one another. Some American taxa have been described as complexes rather than separate species. Estimates of the number of lupine species generally fall between 200 and 500. One authority places the estimate at approximately 267 species worldwide. Currently, two subgenera are recognized.

Subgenus Platycarpos

The ovary contains two and more ovules or seedbuds. The seed are predominantly small-sized, with an underdeveloped embryo and small amount of endosperm. Cotyledons are small-sized, with long caulicles. The first pair of true leaves is alternate. The stem is predominantly naked with waxen coating. Dominating is the monopodial type of branching. Leaflets are smooth, with waxen coating or slight pubescence, predominantly narrow. Pods are flat or orbicular, with two or more seeds. Represented by frutcuilose, fruticose and herbaceous perennial forms, or less often annual ones. Plants are cross-pollinated. Chromosome number 2n is either 36, 48, or 96. This subgenus is distributed throughout North, Central and South America, predominantly in the mining systems of the Andes and Cordillera. Some species are cultivated (L. mutabilis, L. polyphyllus). This subgenus includes several hundred species, requiring further analysis of their authenticity.

It comprises the following species:

 Lupinus aberrans C.P. Sm.

 Lupinus abramsii C.P. Sm. – Abrams' lupine
 Lupinus acopalcus C.P. Sm.
 Lupinus adinoanthus C.P. Sm.

 Lupinus adsurgens Drew – Drew's silky lupine

 Lupinus affinis J. Agardh – fleshy lupine
 Lupinus agardhianus A. Heller
 Lupinus alaristatus C.P. Sm.
 Lupinus albert-smithianus C.P. Sm.

 Lupinus albescens Hook. & Arn. – hoary lupine
 Lupinus albicaulis Douglas – sickle-keel lupine
 Lupinus albifrons Benth. – silver bush lupine
 var. albifrons Benth.
 var. douglasii (J. Agardh) C. P. Sm.
 var. hallii (Abrams) Isely
 Lupinus albopilosus A. Heller
 Lupinus albosericeus C.P. Sm.
 Lupinus alcis-montis C.P. Sm.

 Lupinus aliamandus C.P. Sm.
 Lupinus aliattenuatus C.P. Sm.
 Lupinus alibicolor C.P. Sm.
 Lupinus aliceae C.P. Sm.
 Lupinus alilatissimus C.P. Sm.

 Lupinus alinanus C.P. Sm.
 Lupinus alipatulus C.P. Sm.
 Lupinus alirevolutus C.P. Sm.
 Lupinus alivillosus C.P. Sm.
 Lupinus allargyreius C.P. Sm.

 Lupinus alopecuroides Desr.
 Lupinus alpestris A. Nelson

 Lupinus altimontanus C.P. Sm.
 Lupinus altiplani C.P. Sm.
 Lupinus amabayensis C.P. Sm.
 Lupinus amandus C.P. Sm.

 Lupinus amboensis C.P. Sm.
 Lupinus ammophilus Greene
 var. ammophilus Greene
 var. crassus (Payson) Isely

 Lupinus amnis-otuni C.P. Sm.
 Lupinus ampaiensis C.P. Sm.

 Lupinus amphibius Suksd.
 Lupinus ananeanus Ulbr.
 Lupinus anatolicus W. Święcicki & W. K. Święcicki
 Lupinus andersonii S. Watson – Anderson's lupine
 Lupinus andicola Gillies
 Lupinus andinus Rose ex J. F. Macbr.
 Lupinus angustiflorus Eastw. – narrowflower lupine
 Lupinus antensis C.P. Sm.
 Lupinus antiplani C. P. Sm.
 Lupinus antoninus Eastw. – Anthony Peak lupine
 Lupinus apertus A. Heller
 Lupinus appositus C.P. Sm.

 Lupinus arboreus Sims – yellow bush lupin, tree lupine
 Lupinus arbustus Lindl. – longspur lupine
 subsp. arbustus Lindl.
 subsp. neolaxiflorus D.B.Dunn
 subsp. pseudoparviflorus (Rydb.) D.B.Dunn
 Lupinus arbutosocius C.P. Sm.
 Lupinus archeranus C.P. Sm.
 Lupinus arcticus S. Watson – Arctic lupine
 subsp. arcticus S. Watson
 subsp. subalpinus (Piper & Robinson)D.B.Dunn
 Lupinus arenarius Gardner

 Lupinus arequipensis C.P. Sm.
 Lupinus argenteus Pursh – silvery lupine
 var. argentatus (Rydb.) Barneby
 var. argenteus Pursh
 var. argophyllus (A. Gray) S. Watson
 var. depressus (Rydb.) C. L. Hitchc.
 var. fulvomaculatus (Payson) Barneby
 var. heteranthus (S. Watson) Barneby – Kellogg's spurred lupine
 var. hillii (Greene) Barneby
 var. holosericeus (Torr. & A.Gray) Barneby
 var. montigenus (A. Heller) Barneby
 var. palmeri (S.Watson) Barneby
 var. rubricaulis (Greene) S. L. Welsh
 var. utahensis (S.Watson) Barneby

 Lupinus argurocalyx C.P. Sm.
 Lupinus aridorum McFarlin ex Beckner – scrub lupine
 Lupinus aridulus C.P. Sm.
 Lupinus aridus Lindl.
 Lupinus ariste-josephii C.P. Sm.
 Lupinus arizelus C.P. Sm.
 Lupinus arizonicus (S. Watson) S. Watson
 subsp. arizonicus (S. Watson) S. Watson – Arizona lupine
 subsp. sonorensis Christian & D. Dunn – Sonora lupine
 Lupinus arvensi-plasketti C.P. Sm.
 Lupinus arvensis Benth.
 Lupinus asa-grayanus C.P. Sm.
 Lupinus aschenbornii S. Schauer
 Lupinus asplundianus C.P. Sm.
 Lupinus asymbepus C.P. Sm.
 Lupinus atropurpureus C.P. Sm.
 Lupinus attenuatus Gardner

 Lupinus aureonitens Hook. & Arn.
 Lupinus austrobicolor C.P. Sm.
 Lupinus austrohumifusus C.P. Sm.

 Lupinus austrorientalis C.P. Sm.
 Lupinus austrosericeus C.P. Sm.

 Lupinus ballianus C.P. Sm.
 Lupinus bandelierae C.P. Sm.
 Lupinus bangii Rusby
 Lupinus barbatilabius C.P. Sm.

 Lupinus barkeri Lindl.
 Lupinus bartlettianus C.P. Sm.
 Lupinus benthamii A. Heller
 Lupinus bi-inclinatus C.P. Sm.
 Lupinus bicolor Lindl. – miniature lupine, bicolor lupine, Lindley's annual lupine
 subsp. bicolor Lindl.
 subsp. microphyllus (S. Watson) D. B. Dunn
 subsp. pipersmithii (A. Heller) D. B. Dunn
 subsp. umbellatus (Greene) D. B. Dunn

 Lupinus bingenensis Suksd. – Bingen lupine
 Lupinus blaisdellii Eastw.

 Lupinus bogotensis Benth.
 Lupinus bolivianus C.P. Sm.
 Lupinus bombycinocarpus C.P. Sm.
 Lupinus bonplandius C.P. Sm.

 Lupinus boyacensis C.P. Sm.

 Lupinus brachypremnon C.P. Sm.
 Lupinus bracteolaris Desr.
 Lupinus brandegeei Eastw.
 Lupinus brevecuneus C.P. Sm.
 Lupinus brevicaulis S. Watson – shortstem lupine
 Lupinus brevior (Jeps.) Christian & D.B. Dunn
 Lupinus breviscapus Ulbr.
 Lupinus breweri A. Gray – Brewer's lupine

 Lupinus bryoides C.P. Sm.
 Lupinus buchtienii Rusby
 Lupinus burkartianus C.P. Sm.
 Lupinus burkei S. Watson – Burke's lupine
 Lupinus burkeri Lindl.
 Lupinus caballoanus B.L. Turner
 Lupinus cachupatensis C.P. Sm.
 Lupinus cacuminis Standl.
 Lupinus caeruleus A. Heller
 Lupinus caesius Eastw.
 Lupinus caespitosus Torr. & A. Gray – stemless dwarf lupine
 Lupinus calcensis C.P. Sm.
 Lupinus caldasensis C.P. Sm.
 
 Lupinus camiloanus C.P. Sm.
 Lupinus campestris Schltdl. & Cham.

 
 Lupinus carazensis Ulbr.
 Lupinus carchiensis C.P. Sm.
 Lupinus cardenasianus C.P. Sm.
 Lupinus carhuamayus C.P. Sm.
 Lupinus carlos-ochoae C.P. Sm.
 Lupinus carpapaticus C.P. Sm.
 Lupinus carrikeri C.P. Sm.
 Lupinus caucensis C.P. Sm.

 Lupinus cavicaulis C.P. Sm.
 Lupinus ccorilazensis Vargas ex C. P. Smith
 Lupinus celsimontanus C.P. Sm.
 Lupinus cervinus Kellogg – Santa Lucia lupine
 Lupinus cesar-vargasii C.P. Sm.
 Lupinus cesaranus C.P. Sm.
 Lupinus chachas C.P. Sm.
 Lupinus chamissonis Eschsch. – Chamisso bush lupine
 Lupinus chavanillensis (J.F. Macbr.) C.P. Sm.

 Lupinus chipaquensis C.P. Sm.
 Lupinus chlorolepis C.P. Sm.
 Lupinus chocontensis C.P. Sm.
 Lupinus chongos-bajous C.P. Sm.
 Lupinus christinae A. Heller
 Lupinus chrysanthus Ulbr.
 Lupinus chrysocalyx C.P. Sm.
 Lupinus chumbivilcensis C.P. Sm.
 Lupinus citrinus Kellogg – orange lupine
 Lupinus clarkei Oerst.

 Lupinus cochapatensis C.P. Sm.

 Lupinus colcabambensis C.P. Sm.
 Lupinus collinus (Greene) A. Heller
 Lupinus colombiensis C.P. Sm.

 Lupinus compactiflorus Rose
 Lupinus comptus Benth.
 Lupinus concinnus J. Agardh
 subsp. concinnus J. Agardh
 subsp. orcuttii (S.Watson) D.B.Dunn
 Lupinus condensiflorus C.P. Sm.
 Lupinus confertus Kellogg

 Lupinus congdonii (C.P. Sm.) D.B. Dunn
 Lupinus conicus C.P. Sm.
 Lupinus constancei T.W. Nelson & J.P. Nelson – Lassics lupine
 Lupinus convencionensis C.P. Sm.
 Lupinus cookianus C.P. Sm.
 Lupinus coriaceus Benth.

 Lupinus costaricensis D.B. Dunn
 Lupinus cotopaxiensis C.P. Sm.
 Lupinus couthouyanus C.P. Sm.
 Lupinus covillei Greene – shaggy lupine
 Lupinus crassulus Greene
 Lupinus crassus Payson
 Lupinus croceus Eastw. – saffron-flowered lupine
 Lupinus crotalarioides Benth.
 Lupinus crucis-viridis C.P. Sm.

 Lupinus cuatrecasasii C.P. Sm.
 Lupinus culbertsonii Greene
 subsp. culbertsonii Greene
 subsp. hypolasius (Greene) B.J.Cox

 Lupinus cumulicola Small
 Lupinus cusickii S. Watson
 subsp. abortivus (Greene) B.J.Cox
 subsp. brachypodus (Piper) B.J.Cox
 subsp. cusickii S. Watson
 Lupinus cuspidatus Rusby

 Lupinus cuzcensis C.P. Sm.

 Lupinus cymboides C.P. Sm.

 Lupinus czermakii Briq. & Hochr.

 Lupinus dalesiae Eastw. – Quincy lupine
 Lupinus decemplex C.P. Sm.
 Lupinus decurrens Gardner

 Lupinus deflexus Congdon
 Lupinus delicatulus Sprague & Riley
 Lupinus densiflorus Benth. – dense-flowered lupin
 subsp. densiflorus Benth.
 subsp. lacteus (Kellogg) R.M.Beauch.
 Lupinus depressus Rydb.
 Lupinus diasemus C.P. Sm.
 Lupinus diehlii M.E. Jones
 Lupinus diffusus Nutt. – spreading lupine, Oak Ridge lupine, sky-blue lupine
 Lupinus disjunctus C.P. Sm.

 Lupinus diversalpicola C.P. Sm.

 Lupinus dorae C.P. Sm.
 Lupinus dotatus C.P. Sm.

 Lupinus duranii Eastw. – Mono Lake lupine
 Lupinus dusenianus C.P. Sm.
 Lupinus eanophyllus C.P. Sm.

 Lupinus edysomatus C.P. Sm.
 Lupinus egens C.P. Sm.

 Lupinus elaphoglossum Barneby
 Lupinus elatus I.M. Johnst. – tall silky lupine
 Lupinus elegans Kunth – elegant lupine
 Lupinus elegantulus Eastw.
 Lupinus ellsworthianus C.P. Sm.
 Lupinus elmeri Greene – Elmer's lupine
 

 Lupinus eramosus C.P. Sm.
 Lupinus erectifolius C.P. Sm.

 Lupinus eremonomus C.P. Sm.
 Lupinus eriocalyx (C.P. Sm.) C.P. Sm.
 Lupinus eriocladus Ulbr.
 Lupinus evermannii Rydb.
 Lupinus espinarensis C.P. Sm.
 Lupinus exaltatus Zucc.
 Lupinus excubitus M.E. Jones – grape soda lupine
 subsp. austromontanus (A.Heller) R.M.Beauch.
 subsp. excubitus M.E. Jones
 Lupinus exochus C.P. Sm.
 Lupinus expetendus C.P. Sm.
 Lupinus extrarius C.P. Sm.
 Lupinus falsomutabilis C.P. Sm.
 Lupinus falsoprostratus C.P. Sm.
 Lupinus falsorevolutus C.P. Sm.
 Lupinus famelicus C.P. Sm.

 Lupinus fiebrigianus Ulbr.
 Lupinus fieldii J.F. Macbr.

 Lupinus fissicalyx A. Heller

 Lupinus flavoculatus A. Heller

 Lupinus foliolosus Benth.

 Lupinus formosus Greene – summer lupine
 var. bridgesii (S.Watson) Greene
 var. formosus Greene

 Lupinus fragrans A. Heller
 Lupinus francis-whittieri C.P. Sm.
 Lupinus fratrum C.P. Sm.
 Lupinus fulcratus Greene

 Lupinus gachetensis C.P. Sm.

 Lupinus garfieldensis C.P. Sm.
 Lupinus gaudichaudianus C.P. Sm.
 Lupinus gayanus C.P. Sm.

 Lupinus gentryanus C.P. Sm.
 Lupinus geophilus Rose
 Lupinus gibertianus C.P. Sm.
 Lupinus giganteus Rose
 Lupinus glabratus J. Agardh

 Lupinus goodspeedii J.F. Macbr.
 Lupinus gormanii Piper
 Lupinus gracilentus Greene

 Lupinus grayi S. Watson – Sierra lupine
 Lupinus grauensis C.P. Sm.

 Lupinus grisebachianus C.P. Sm.
 Lupinus guadalupensis C.P. Sm. – Guadalupe Island lupine
 Lupinus guaraniticus (Hassl.) C.P. Sm.
 Lupinus guascensis C.P. Sm.
 Lupinus guggenheimianus Rusby

 Lupinus hamaticalyx C.P. Sm.
 Lupinus hartmannii C.P. Sm.
 Lupinus hartwegii Lindl.
 Lupinus haughtianus C.P. Sm.
 Lupinus hautcarazensis C.P. Sm.
 Lupinus havardii S. Watson
 Lupinus hazenanus C.P. Sm.
 Lupinus hendersonii Eastw.

 Lupinus heptaphyllus (Vell.) Hassl.
 Lupinus herreranus C.P. Sm.
 Lupinus herzogii Ulbr.
 Lupinus hieronymii C.P. Sm.
 Lupinus hilarianus Benth.
 Lupinus hillii Greene
 Lupinus hinkleyorum C.P. Sm.
 Lupinus hintoniorum B.L. Turner
 Lupinus hirsutissimus Benth. – stinging lupine

 Lupinus holmgrenianus C.P. Sm. – Holmgren's lupine

 Lupinus honoratus C.P. Sm.
 Lupinus horizontalis A. Heller
 Lupinus hornemanni J. Agardh
 Lupinus hortonianus C.P. Sm.
 Lupinus hortorum C.P. Sm.
 Lupinus howard-scottii C.P. Sm.
 Lupinus howardii M.E. Jones
 Lupinus huachucanus M.E. Jones
 Lupinus huancayoensis C.P. Sm.
 Lupinus huariacus C.P. Sm.
 Lupinus huaronensis J.F. Macbr.
 Lupinus huigrensis Rose ex C. P. Sm.

 Lupinus humifusus Sessé & Moc. ex G. Don
 Lupinus hyacinthinus C.F. Baker – San Jacinto lupine
 Lupinus hybridus Lem.

 Lupinus ignobilis C.P. Sm.
 Lupinus imminutus C.P. Sm.

 Lupinus indigoticus Eastw.
 Lupinus inflatus C.P. Sm.

 Lupinus insignis C.P. Sm.
 Lupinus insulae C.P. Sm.

 Lupinus interruptus Benth.
 Lupinus intortus C.P. Sm.
 Lupinus inusitatus C.P. Sm.
 Lupinus involutus C.P. Sm.
 Lupinus inyoensis A. Heller
 Lupinus isabelianus Eastw.

 Lupinus jahnii Rose ex Pittier
 Lupinus jaimehintoniana B.L. Turner
 Lupinus james-westii C.P. Sm.
 Lupinus jean-julesii C.P. Sm.
 Lupinus jelskianus C.P. Sm.
 Lupinus johannis-howellii C.P. Sm.
 Lupinus jonesii Rydb.
 Lupinus jujuyensis C.P. Sm.
 Lupinus juninensis C.P. Sm.

 Lupinus kalenbornorum C.P. Sm.

 Lupinus kellermanianus C.P. Sm.
 Lupinus kerrii Eastw.
 Lupinus killipianus C.P. Sm.
 Lupinus kingii S. Watson

 Lupinus klamathensis Eastw.
 Lupinus kunthii J. Agardh

 Lupinus kuschei Eastw. – Yukon lupine

 Lupinus lacus C.P. Sm.

 Lupinus laetus Wooton & Standl.
 Lupinus laevigatus Benth.
 Lupinus lagunae-negrae C.P. Sm.
 Lupinus lanatocarpus C.P. Sm.
 Lupinus lanatus Benth.
 Lupinus lapidicola A. Heller – Mt. Eddy lupine

 Lupinus latifolius J. Agardh
 subsp. dudleyi (C.P.Sm.) P.Kenney & D.B.Dunn
 subsp. latifolius J. Agardh
 var. latifolius J. Agardh – broadleaf lupine
 var. barbatus – Klamath lupine, bearded lupine
 subsp. leucanthus (Rydb.)P.Kenney & D.B.Dunn
 subsp. longipes (Greene) P.Kenney & D.B.Dunn
 subsp. parishii (C.P.Sm.) P.Kenney & D.B.Dunn
 subsp. viridifolius (A.Heller) P.Kenney & D.B.Dunn

 Lupinus laudandrus C.P. Sm.

 Lupinus lechlerianus C.P. Sm.
 Lupinus ledigianus C.P. Sm.
 Lupinus lelandsmithii Eastw.
 Lupinus lemmonii C.P. Sm.

 Lupinus lepidus Lindl. – prairie lupine
 var. aridus (Douglas) Jeps.
 var. confertus (Kellogg) C. P. Sm.
 var. lepidus Lindl.
 var. lobbii (A. Gray ex S. Watson) C. L. Hitchc.
 var. sellulus (Kellogg) Barneby
 var. utahensis (S. Watson) C. L. Hitchc.
 Lupinus leptocarpus Benth.
 Lupinus leptophyllus Cham. & Schltdl.

 Lupinus lespedezoides C.P. Sm.

 Lupinus leucophyllus Lindl. – woolly-leaf lupine

 Lupinus lilacinus A. Heller
 Lupinus lindenianus C.P. Sm.
 Lupinus lindleyanus J. Agardh
 Lupinus linearis Desr.
 Lupinus littoralis Lindl. – seashore lupine
 Lupinus lobbianus C.P. Sm.

 Lupinus longifolius (S. Watson) Abrams – longleaf bush lupine

 Lupinus lorenzensis C.P. Sm.
 Lupinus ludovicianus Greene – San Luis Obispo County Lupine
 Lupinus luetzelburgianus C.P. Sm.

 Lupinus luteolus Kellogg – butter lupine, pale yellow lupine
 Lupinus lutescens C.P. Sm.
 Lupinus lutosus A. Heller
 Lupinus lyallii A. Gray
 subsp. alcis-temporis (C.P. Sm.) B.J.Cox
 subsp. lyallii A. Gray – Lyall's lupine
 subsp. minutifolius (Eastw.) B.J.Cox
 subsp. washoensis (A.Heller) B.J.Cox

 Lupinus macbrideanus C.P. Sm.

 Lupinus macranthus Rose

 Lupinus maculatus Rydb.
 Lupinus madrensis Seem.
 Lupinus magdalenensis C.P. Sm.
 Lupinus magnificus M.E. Jones
 Lupinus magniflorus C.P. Sm.
 Lupinus magnistipulatus Planchuelo & D.B. Dunn
 Lupinus malacophyllus Greene
 Lupinus malacotrichus C.P. Sm.
 Lupinus maleopinatus C.P. Sm.
 Lupinus mandonanus C.P. Sm.
 Lupinus mantaroensis C.P. Sm.

 Lupinus marinensis Eastw.
 Lupinus mariposanus Eastw.
 Lupinus martensis C.P. Sm.
 Lupinus martinetianus (C.P. Sm.) C.P. Sm.
 Lupinus mathewsianus C.P. Sm.
 Lupinus matucanicus Ulbr.
 Lupinus meionanthus A. Gray
 Lupinus melaphyllus C.P. Sm.
 Lupinus menziesii J. Agardh
 Lupinus meridanus C.P. Sm.

 Lupinus metensis C.P. Sm.
 Lupinus mexicanus Lag.
 Lupinus michelianus C. P. Sm.

 Lupinus microcarpus Sims
 var. densiflorus
 var. microcarpus – wide-bannered lupin, chick lupin
 Lupinus microphyllus Desr.

 Lupinus minimus Hook.

 Lupinus mirabilis C.P. Sm.

 Lupinus misticola Ulbr.
 Lupinus mollendoensis Ulbr.
 Lupinus mollis A. Heller
 Lupinus monensis Eastw.
 Lupinus monserratensis C.P. Sm.
 Lupinus montanus Kunth
 subsp. glabrior (S.Watson) D.B.Dunn & Harmon
 subsp. montanus Kunth
 subsp. montesii (C.P.Sm.) D.B.Dunn & Harmon

 Lupinus monticola Rydb.
 Lupinus montigenus A. Heller

 Lupinus moritzianus Kunth
 Lupinus mucronulatus Howell
 Lupinus muelleri Standl.

 Lupinus multiflorus Desr.

 Lupinus munzianus C.P. Sm.
 Lupinus munzii Eastw.
 Lupinus mutabilis Sweet – Andean lupin, pearl lupin, South American lupin, tarwi, tarhui, chocho

 Lupinus nanus Benth. – dwarf lupin, field lupin, sky lupin, Douglas' annual lupin
 Lupinus navicularius A. Heller
 Lupinus nehmadae C.P. Sm.

 Lupinus neocotus C.P. Sm.
 Lupinus neomexicanus Greene
 Lupinus nepubescens C.P. Sm.
 Lupinus nevadensis A. Heller – Nevada lupine
 Lupinus niederleinianus C.P. Sm.
 Lupinus nipomensis Eastw. – Nipomo Mesa lupine

 Lupinus niveus S. Watson
 Lupinus nonoensis C.P. Sm.
 Lupinus nootkatensis Sims – Nootka lupin
 Lupinus notabilis C.P. Sm.
 Lupinus nubigenus Kunth
 Lupinus nubilorum C.P. Sm.

 Lupinus obscurus C.P. Sm.
 Lupinus obtusilobus A. Heller – bluntlobe lupine
 Lupinus ochoanus C.P. Sm.
 Lupinus ochroleucus Eastw.
 Lupinus odoratus A. Heller – royal Mojave lupin
 Lupinus onustus S. Watson – Plumas lupine
 Lupinus opertospicus C.P. Sm.
 Lupinus oquendoanus C.P. Sm.

 Lupinus oreganus A. Heller – Oregon lupin
 Lupinus oreophilus Phil.
 Lupinus ornatus Lindl.
 Lupinus oscar-haughtii C.P. Sm.
 Lupinus ostiofluminis C.P. Sm.

 Lupinus otto-buchtienii C.P. Sm.
 Lupinus otto-kuntzeanus C.P. Sm.
 Lupinus otuzcoensis C.P. Sm.
 Lupinus ovalifolius Benth.

 Lupinus pachanoanus C.P. Sm.
 Lupinus pachitensis C.P. Sm.
 Lupinus pachylobus Greene
 Lupinus padre-crowleyi C.P. Sm. – DeDecker's lupine, Father Crowley's lupine
 Lupinus pallidus Brandegee

 Lupinus paniculatus Desr.
 Lupinus paraguariensis Chodat & Hassl.
 Lupinus paranensis C.P. Sm.

 Lupinus paruroensis C.P. Sm.
 Lupinus parviflorus Hook. & Arn. – lodgepole lupin
 subsp. myrianthus (Greene) Harmon
 subsp. parviflorus Hook. & Arn.
 Lupinus parvifolius Gardner
 Lupinus pasachoensis C.P. Sm.
 Lupinus pasadenensis Eastw.
 Lupinus patulus C.P. Sm.
 Lupinus paucartambensis C.P. Sm.
 Lupinus paucovillosus C.P. Sm.

 Lupinus paynei Davidson
 Lupinus pearceanus C.P. Sm.
 Lupinus pendentiflorus C.P. Sm.
 Lupinus peirsonii H. Mason – Peirson's lupine, long lupine
 Lupinus penlandianus C.P. Sm.

 Lupinus perblandus C.P. Sm.
 Lupinus perbonus C.P. Sm.
 Lupinus perennis L. – wild perennial lupine, sundial lupine, Indian beet, old maid's bonnets
 subsp. gracilis (Nutt.) D.B.Dunn
 subsp. occidentalis S. Watson
 subsp. perennis L.
 Lupinus perglaber Eastw.
 Lupinus perissophytus C.P. Sm.
 Lupinus persistens Rose
 Lupinus peruvianus Ulbr.
 Lupinus philippianus C.P. Sm.
 Lupinus physodes Douglas
 Lupinus pickeringii A. Gray

 Lupinus pilosellus Eastw.
 Lupinus pilosissimus M. Martens & Galeotti
 Lupinus pinguis Ulbr.
 Lupinus pipersmithianus J.F. Macbr.
 Lupinus pisacensis C.P. Sm.
 Lupinus piurensis C.P. Sm.
 Lupinus platamodes C.P. Sm.
 Lupinus plattensis S. Watson
 Lupinus platyptenus C.P. Sm.

 Lupinus polycarpus Greene – smallflower lupin
 Lupinus polyphyllus Lindl. – largeleaf lupine, bigleaf lupine, garden lupin, many-leaved lupine
 var. burkei (S. Watson) C. L. Hitchc.
 var. humicola (A.Nelson) Barneby
 var. pallidipes (A. Heller) C. P. Sm.
 var. polyphyllus Lindl.
 var. prunophilus (M. E. Jones) L. Ll. Phillips
 Lupinus poopoensis C.P. Sm.
 Lupinus popayanensis C.P. Sm.

 Lupinus potosinus Rose
 Lupinus praealtus C.P. Sm.
 Lupinus praestabilis C.P. Sm.
 Lupinus praetermissus C.P. Sm.
 Lupinus pratensis A.Heller – Inyo Meadow lupine
 Lupinus pringlei Rose
 Lupinus proculaustrinus C.P. Sm.
 Lupinus prostratus J. Agardh
 Lupinus protrusus C.P. Sm.
 Lupinus prouvensalanus C.P. Sm.
 Lupinus prunophilus M.E. Jones – hairy bigleaf lupin

 Lupinus pseudopolyphyllus C.P. Sm.
 Lupinus pseudotsugoides C.P. Sm.
 Lupinus pubescens Benth.
 Lupinus pucapucensis C.P. Sm.

 Lupinus pulloviridus C.P. Sm.
 Lupinus pulvinaris Ulbr.

 Lupinus punto-reyesensis C.P. Sm.
 Lupinus puracensis C.P. Sm.
 Lupinus purdieanus C.P. Sm.
 Lupinus pureriae C.P. Sm.

 Lupinus purosericeus C.P. Sm.
 Lupinus pusillus Pursh – rusty lupine or dwarf lupine
 subsp. intermontanus (A.Heller) D.B.Dunn
 subsp. pusillus Pursh
 Lupinus puyupatensis C.P. Sm.
 Lupinus pycnostachys C.P. Sm.
 Lupinus quellomayus C.P. Sm.
 Lupinus quitensis C.P. Sm.
 Lupinus radiatus C.P. Sm.
 Lupinus ramosissimus Benth.
 Lupinus reflexus Rose
 Lupinus regalis Bergmans
 Lupinus regnellianus C.P. Sm.
 Lupinus reineckianus C.P. Sm.
 Lupinus reitzii Burkart ex M. Pinheiro & Miotto

 Lupinus retrorsus L.F. Hend.
 Lupinus revolutus C.P. Sm.
 Lupinus richardianus C.P. Sm.
 Lupinus rimae Eastw.
 Lupinus rivularis Lindl. – riverbank lupin
 Lupinus romasanus Ulbr.

 Lupinus roseolus Rydb.
 Lupinus roseorum C.P. Sm.
 Lupinus rotundiflorus M.E. Jones

 Lupinus rowleeanus C.P. Sm.

 Lupinus ruber A. Heller

 Lupinus rubriflorus Planchuelo

 Lupinus ruizensis C.P. Sm.
 Lupinus rupestris Kunth
 Lupinus rusbyanus C.P. Sm.
 Lupinus russellianus C.P. Sm.
 Lupinus sabinianus Lindl.
 Lupinus sabinii Hook.
 Lupinus sabulosus A. Heller
 Lupinus salticola Eastw.
 Lupinus sandiensis C.P. Sm.
 Lupinus santanderensis C.P. Sm.
 Lupinus sarmentosus Desr.
 Lupinus saxatilis Ulbr.
 Lupinus saxosus Howell – rock lupine
 Lupinus schwackeanus C.P. Sm.
 Lupinus seifrizianus (C.P. Sm.) C.P. Sm.
 Lupinus sellowianus Harms
 Lupinus sellulus Kellogg
 var. lobbii (S.Watson) B.J.Cox
 var. sellulus Kellogg
 var. ursinus (Eastw.) B.J.Cox
 Lupinus semiprostratus C.P. Sm.
 Lupinus semperflorens Benth.
 Lupinus sericatus Kellogg – Cobb Mountain lupine

 Lupinus sericeus Pursh – Pursh's silky lupin
 var. barbiger (S.Watson) S.L.Welsh
 var. sericeus Pursh
 Lupinus setifolius Planchuelo & D.B. Dunn
 Lupinus shastensis Lupinus albicaulis
 Lupinus shockleyi S. Watson – purple desert lupine
 Lupinus sierrae-blancae Wooton & Standl.
 subsp. aquilinus (Wooton & Standl.) L.S.Fleak & D.B.Dunn
 subsp. sierrae-blancae Wooton & Standl.
 Lupinus simonsianus C.P. Sm.
 Lupinus simulans Rose
 Lupinus sinaloensis C.P. Sm.
 Lupinus sitgreavesii S. Watson

 Lupinus smithianus Kunth
 Lupinus solanagrorum C.P. Sm.
 Lupinus sonomensis A. Heller
 Lupinus soratensis Rusby
 Lupinus soukupianus C. P. Smith ex J. F. Macbr.
 Lupinus sparsiflorus Benth. – desert lupin, Coulter's lupin, Mojave lupin

 Lupinus spectabilis Hoover – shaggyhair lupine
 Lupinus splendens Rose
 Lupinus spragueanus C.P. Sm.

 Lupinus staffordiae C.P. Sm.

 Lupinus stipulatus J. Agardh
 Lupinus stiversii Kellogg – harlequin annual lupine

 Lupinus storkianus C.P. Sm.
 Lupinus subacaulis Griseb.

 Lupinus subcarnosus Hook. – buffalo clover
 Lupinus subcuneatus C.P. Sm.
 Lupinus subhamatus C.P. Sm.
 Lupinus subinflatus C.P. Sm.
 Lupinus sublanatus Eastw.
 Lupinus submontanus Rose
 Lupinus subsessilis Benth.
 Lupinus subtomentosus C.P. Sm.

 Lupinus subvexus C.P. Sm.
 Lupinus succulentus K. Koch – succulent lupin, arroyo lupin, hollowleaf annual lupin
 Lupinus sufferrugineus Rusby
 Lupinus suksdorfii Robinson
 Lupinus sulphureus Douglas
 subsp. kincaidii (Suksd.) L. Ll. Phillips – Kincaid's lupin
 subsp. subsaccatus (Suksd.) L. Ll. Phillips
 subsp. sulphureus Douglas – sulphur lupin, sulphur-flowered lupin
 Lupinus surcoensis C.P. Sm.

 Lupinus syriggedes C.P. Sm.
 Lupinus tacitus C.P. Sm.
 Lupinus tafiensis C.P. Sm.
 Lupinus talahuensis C.P. Sm.
 Lupinus tamayoanus C.P. Sm.

 Lupinus tarapacensis C.P. Sm.
 Lupinus tarijensis Ulbr.
 Lupinus tarmaensis C.P. Sm.
 Lupinus tatei Rusby
 Lupinus taurimortuus C.P. Sm.
 Lupinus tauris Benth.
 Lupinus tayacajensis C.P. Sm.
 Lupinus tegeticulatus Eastw.

 Lupinus tetracercophorus C.P. Sm.
 Lupinus texanus Hook.
 Lupinus texensis Hook. – Texas bluebonnet
 Lupinus thompsonianus C.P. Sm.
 Lupinus tidestromii Greene – Tidestrøm's lupin
 var. layneae (Eastw.) Munz
 var. tidestromii Greene

 Lupinus tolimensis C.P. Sm.
 Lupinus tomentosus DC.
 Lupinus tominensis Wedd.
 Lupinus toratensis C.P. Sm. – warwanzo, lito
 Lupinus tracyi Eastw. – Tracy's lupine
 Lupinus triananus C.P. Sm.

 Lupinus truncatus Hook. & Arn. – collared annual lupine
 Lupinus tucumanensis C.P. Sm.
 Lupinus ulbrichianus C.P. Sm.
 Lupinus uleanus C.P. Sm.
 Lupinus ultramontanus C.P. Sm.
 Lupinus umidicola C.P. Sm.
 Lupinus uncialis S. Watson
 Lupinus uncinatus Schltdl.
 Lupinus urcoensis C.P. Sm.

 Lupinus urubambensis C.P. Sm.

 Lupinus valerioi Standl.
 Lupinus vallicola A. Heller – open lupin
 subsp. apricus (Greene) D.B.Dunn
 subsp. vallicola A. Heller
 Lupinus vargasianus C.P. Sm.
 Lupinus varicaulis C.P. Sm.

 Lupinus variicolor Steud. – varied lupin
 Lupinus velillensis C.P. Sm.
 Lupinus velutinus Benth.
 Lupinus venezuelensis C.P. Sm.
 Lupinus ventosus C.P. Sm.
 Lupinus verbasciformis Sandwith
 Lupinus verjonensis C.P. Sm.
 Lupinus vernicius Rose

 Lupinus viduus C.P. Sm.
 Lupinus vilcabambensis C.P. Sm.
 Lupinus villosus Willd.

 Lupinus visoensis J.F. Macbr.
 Lupinus volubilis C.P. Sm.

 Lupinus weberbaueri Ulbr.

 Lupinus werdermannianus C.P. Sm.
 Lupinus westianus Small
 var. aridorum (McFarlin ex Beckner) Isely
 var. westianus Small
 Lupinus whiltoniae Eastw.
 Lupinus wilkesianus C.P. Sm.
 Lupinus williamlobbii C.P. Sm.
 Lupinus williamsianus C.P. Sm.

 Lupinus xanthophyllus C.P. Sm.
 Lupinus xenophytus C.P. Sm.

 Lupinus yanahuancensis C.P. Sm.
 Lupinus yarushensis C.P. Sm.

 Lupinus ynesiae C.P. Sm.

Subgenus Lupinus 

In its current circumscription, subgenus Lupinus includes 12 species from the Mediterranean region and Africa with at least four ovules or seedbuds in the ovary:
 Lupinus albus L. 1753 – white lupine
 subsp. albus L.
 subsp. graecus (Boiss. & Spruner) Franco & P.Silva
 subsp. termis (Forsk.) Ponert.
 Lupinus angustifolius L. 1753 – blue lupin, narrow-leafed lupin
 var. angustifolius L.
 var. albopunctatus Kurl. et Stankev.
 var. griseomaculatus Kurl. et Stankev.
 var. chalybens Kurl. et Stankev.
 var. corylinus Kurl. et Stankev.
 var. purpureus Kurl. et Stankev.
 var. rubidus Kurl. et Stankev.
 var. atabekovae Kurl. et Stankev.
 var. sparsiusculus Kurl. et Stankev.
 var. brunneus  Kurl. et Stankev.
 var. albosyringeus Taran.
 var. albidus Kurl. et Stankev.
 var. candidus Kuptzov. et Kurl.
 Lupinus atlanticus Gladstones 1974
 Lupinus cosentinii Guss. 1828  – sandplain lupin

 Lupinus digitatus Forsk. 1775

 Lupinus hispanicus Boiss. & Reut. 1842
 subsp. bicolor (Merino) Gladst.
 subsp. hispanicus Boiss. & Reut.

 Lupinus luteus L. 1753 – yellow lupin
 var. luteus L.
 var. maculosus Kurl. et Stankev.
 var. kazimierskii Kurl. et Stankev.
 var. arcellus Kurl. et Stankev.
 var. sempolovskii (Atab) Kurl. et Stankev.
 var. melanospermus Kurl. et Stankev.
 var. niger Kurl. et Stankev.
 var. cremeus Kurl. et Stankev.
 var. leucospermus Kurl. et Stankev.
 var. sulphureus (Atab.) Kurl. et Stankev.
 var. stepanovae Kurl. et Stankev.
 var. ochroleucus Kurl. et Stankev.
 var. aurantiacus Kurl. et Stankev.
 var. croceus Kurl. et Stankev.
 var. aureus Kurl. et Stankev.
 var. albicans Kurl. et Stankev.
 var.  sinskayae Kurl. et Stankev.
 Lupinus micranthus Guss. 1828
 Lupinus palaestinus Boiss. 1849 – white-grey lupine
 Lupinus pilosus Murr. 1774 – blue lupine
 Lupinus princei Harms 1901

 Lupinus somaliensis Baker f. 1895

Species names with uncertain taxonomic status
The status of the following binomials is unresolved:

 Lupinus acaulis Larrañaga
 Lupinus achilleaphilus C.P.Sm.
 Lupinus acutilobus A.Heller
 Lupinus aegr-Aovium C.P.Sm.
 Lupinus africanus Lour.
 Lupinus agninus Gand.
 Lupinus agropyrophilus C.P.Sm.
 Lupinus alaimandus C.P.Sm.
 Lupinus albicaulis Douglas ex Hook.
 Lupinus alicanescens C.P.Sm.
 Lupinus aliclementinus C.P.Sm.
 Lupinus aliumbellatus C.P.Sm.
 Lupinus altissimus Sessé & Moc.
 Lupinus alturasensis C.P.Sm.
 Lupinus alveorum C.P.Sm.
 Lupinus amabilis A.Heller
 Lupinus amniculi-cervi C.P.Sm.
 Lupinus amniculi-salicis C.P.Sm.
 Lupinus amniculi-vulpum C.P.Sm.
 Lupinus andersonianus C.P.Sm.
 Lupinus anemophilus Greene
 Lupinus angustifolius Blanco
 Lupinus aphronorus Blank.
 Lupinus apodotropis A.Heller
 Lupinus aralloius C.P.Sm.
 Lupinus arborescens Amabekova & Maisuran
 Lupinus arceuthinus Greene
 Lupinus argyraeus DC.
 Lupinus atacamicus C.P.Sm.
 Lupinus aureus J.Agardh
 Lupinus axillaris Blank.
 Lupinus barkeriae Knowles & Westc.
 Lupinus bartolomei M.E.Jones
 Lupinus bassett-maguirei C.P.Sm.
 Lupinus beaneanus C.P.Sm.
 Lupinus biddleii L.F.Hend.
 Lupinus bimaculatus Hook. ex D.Don
 Lupinus bimaculatus Desr.
 Lupinus bivonii C.Presl
 Lupinus blankinshipii A.Heller
 Lupinus blaschkeanus Fisch. & C.A.Mey.
 Lupinus brevior (Jeps.) J.A. Christian & D.B. Dunn
 Lupinus brittonii Abrams
 Lupinus caespitosus Nutt.
 Lupinus californicus K.Koch
 Lupinus campbelliae Eastw.
 Lupinus campestris Cham. & Schltdl.
 Lupinus campestris-florum C.P.Sm.
 Lupinus candicans Rydb.
 Lupinus canus Hemsl.
 Lupinus capitatus Greene
 Lupinus capitis-amniculi C.P.Sm.
 Lupinus carolus-bucarii C.P.Sm.
 Lupinus chachas Ochoa ex C. P. Smith
 Lupinus chamissonis Eschscholtz
 Lupinus chiapensis Rose
 Lupinus chihuahuensis S.Watson
 Lupinus christianus C.P.Sm.
 Lupinus chrysomelas Casar.
 Lupinus clementinus Greene
 Lupinus comatus Rydb.
 Lupinus consentinii Walp.
 Lupinus cymb-Aegressus C.P.Sm.
 Lupinus dasyphyllus Greene
 Lupinus davisianus C.P.Sm.
 Lupinus debilis Eastw.
 Lupinus decaschistus C.P.Sm.
 Lupinus diaboli-septem C.P.Sm.
 Lupinus dichrous Greene
 Lupinus dispersus A.Heller
 Lupinus dissimulans C.P.Sm.
 Lupinus durangensis C.P.Sm.
 Lupinus eatonanus C.P.Sm.
 Lupinus equi-coeli C.P.Sm.
 Lupinus equi-collis C.P.Sm.
 Lupinus erectus L.F.Hend.
 Lupinus erminens S.Watson
 Lupinus ermineus S.Watson
 Lupinus falcifer Nutt.
 Lupinus falsoerectus C.P.Sm.
 Lupinus falsoformosus C.P.Sm.
 Lupinus falsograyi C.P.Sm.
 Lupinus fieldii Rose ex J. F. Macbr.
 Lupinus filicaulis C.P.Sm.
 Lupinus finitus C.P.Sm.
 Lupinus flavescens Rydb.
 Lupinus foliosus Hook.
 Lupinus foliosus Nutt.
 Lupinus forskahlei Boiss.
 Lupinus franciscanus Greene
 Lupinus fraxinetorum Greene
 Lupinus fruticosus Steud.
 Lupinus fruticosus Dum.Cours.
 Lupinus garcianus Bennett & Dunn
 Lupinus geophilus Rose
 Lupinus geraniophilus C.P.Sm.
 Lupinus glabellus M.Martens & Galeotti
 Lupinus graciliflorus C.P.Sm.
 Lupinus gratus Greene
 Lupinus gredensis Gand.
 Lupinus guadalupensis Greene
 Lupinus guadiloupensis Steud.
 Lupinus guatimalensis auct.
 Lupinus gussoneanus J.Agardh
 Lupinus habrocomus Greene
 Lupinus haudcytisoides C.P.Sm.
 Lupinus helleri Greene
 Lupinus hexaedrus E. Fourn.
 Lupinus hintonii C.P.Sm.
 Lupinus huigrensis Rose ex C.P.Sm.
 Lupinus humicolus A.Nelson
 Lupinus humifusus Benth.
 Lupinus humilis Rose ex Pittier
 Lupinus hyacinthinus Greene
 Lupinus idoneus C.P.Sm.
 Lupinus inamoenus Greene ex C.F.Baker
 Lupinus indutus Greene ex C.F.Baker
 Lupinus insignis Glaz. ex C. P. Smith
 Lupinus integrifolius L.
 Lupinus intergrifolius Desr.
 Lupinus ione-grisetae C.P.Sm.
 Lupinus ione-walkerae C.P.Sm.
 Lupinus jamesonianus C.P.Sm.
 Lupinus javanicus Burm.f.
 Lupinus jorgensenanus C.P.Sm.
 Lupinus jucundus Greene
 Lupinus kellerrnanianus C.P.Sm.
 Lupinus kyleanus C.P.Sm.
 Lupinus labiatus Nutt.
 Lupinus lacticolor Tamayo
 Lupinus lacus-huntingtonii C.P.Sm.
 Lupinus lacuum-trinitatum C.P.Sm.
 Lupinus larsonanus C.P.Sm.
 Lupinus lassenensis Eastw.
 Lupinus latissimus Greene
 Lupinus laxifolius A.Gray
 Lupinus leptostachyus Greene
 Lupinus lesueurii Standl.
 Lupinus linearifolius Larrañaga
 Lupinus lingulae C.P.Sm.
 Lupinus longilabrum C.P.Sm.
 Lupinus lorentzianus C.P.Sm.
 Lupinus louise-bucariae C.P.Sm.
 Lupinus louise-grisetae C.P.Sm.
 Lupinus lucidus Benth. ex Loudon
 Lupinus lyman-bensonii C.P.Sm.
 Lupinus lysichitophilus C.P.Sm.
 Lupinus macrocarpus Hook. & Arn.
 Lupinus macrocarpus Torr.
 Lupinus macrophyllus Benth.
 Lupinus macrorhizos Georgi
 Lupinus magnistipulatus Planchuelo & Dunn
 Lupinus maissurianii Atabek. & Polukhina
 Lupinus marcusianus C.P.Sm.
 Lupinus mariae-josephae H.Pascual
 Lupinus markleanus C.P.Sm.
 Lupinus marschallianus Sweet
 Lupinus mearnsii C.P.Sm.
 Lupinus meli-campestris C.P.Sm.
 Lupinus meridanus Moritz ex C. P. Smith
 Lupinus mexiae C.P.Sm.
 Lupinus micensis M.E.Jones
 Lupinus micheneri Greene
 Lupinus milleri J.Agardh
 Lupinus minearanus C.P.Sm.
 Lupinus minutissimus Tamayo
 Lupinus molle A.Heller
 Lupinus mollissifolius Davidson
 Lupinus monettianus C.P.Sm.
 Lupinus muellerianus C.P.Sm.
 Lupinus multicincinnis C.P.Sm.
 Lupinus neglectus Rose
 Lupinus nemoralis Greene
 Lupinus niger Wehmer
 Lupinus noldekae Eastw.
 Lupinus nutcanus Spreng.
 Lupinus nutkatensis J.G.Cooper
 Lupinus obtunsus C.P.Sm.
 Lupinus octablomus C.P.Sm.
 Lupinus opsianthus Amabekova & Maisuran
 Lupinus pavonum C.P.Sm.
 Lupinus pendeltonii A.Heller
 Lupinus pendletonii A.Heller
 Lupinus perconfertus C.P.Sm.
 Lupinus perplexus C.P.Sm.
 Lupinus philistaeus Boiss.
 Lupinus pinus-contortae C.P.Sm.
 Lupinus piperi B.L.Rob. ex Piper
 Lupinus piperitus Davidson
 Lupinus platanophilus M.E.Jones
 Lupinus plebeius Greene ex C.F.Baker
 Lupinus prato-lacuum C.P.Sm.
 Lupinus prolifer Desr.
 Lupinus propinquus Greene
 Lupinus proteanus Eastw.
 Lupinus psoraleoides Pollard
 Lupinus pumviridis C.P.Sm.
 Lupinus puroviridis C.P.Sm.
 Lupinus purpurascens A.Heller
 Lupinus pygmaeus Tamayo
 Lupinus quercus-jugi C.P.Sm.
 Lupinus quercuum C.P.Sm.
 Lupinus rainierensis Eastw.
 Lupinus regius Rudolph ex Torr. & A.Gray
 Lupinus rhodanthus C.P.Sm.
 Lupinus rickeri C.P.Sm.
 Lupinus rivetianus C.P.Sm.
 Lupinus rydbergii Blank.
 Lupinus sabuli C.P.Sm.
 Lupinus salicisocius C.P.Sm.
 Lupinus salinensis C.P.Sm.
 Lupinus sativus Gaterau
 Lupinus scaposus Rydb.
 Lupinus scheuberae Rydb.
 Lupinus schickendantzii C.P.Sm.
 Lupinus schiedeanus Steud.
 Lupinus schumannii C.P.Sm.
 Lupinus seclusus C.P.Sm.
 Lupinus semiaequus C.P.Sm.
 Lupinus semiverticillatus Desr.
 Lupinus sergenti Tamayo ex Pittier
 Lupinus sergentii Tamayo
 Lupinus serradentum C.P.Sm.
 Lupinus shrevei C.P.Sm.
 Lupinus sierrae-zentae C.P.Sm.
 Lupinus sileri S.Watson
 Lupinus sinus-meyersii C.P. Sm.
 Lupinus sparhawkianus C.P.Sm.
 Lupinus spatulata Larrañaga
 Lupinus speciosus Voss
 Lupinus spruceanus C.P.Sm.
 Lupinus standleyensis C.P.Sm.
 Lupinus stationis C.P.Sm.
 Lupinus stiveri Kellogg
 Lupinus stoloniferus L.
 Lupinus strigulosus Gand.
 Lupinus subhirsutus Davidson
 Lupinus subvolutus C.P.Sm.
 Lupinus suksdorfii B.L. Rob. ex Piper
 Lupinus summersianus C.P.Sm.
 Lupinus sylvaticus Hemsl.
 Lupinus thermis Gasp.
 Lupinus thermus St.-Lag.
 Lupinus tilcaricus C.P.Sm.
 Lupinus timotensis Tamayo
 Lupinus tricolor Greene
 Lupinus tricolor G.Nicholson
 Lupinus trifidus Torr. ex S.Watson
 Lupinus tristis Sweet
 Lupinus trochophyllus Hoffmanns.
 Lupinus tuckeranus C.P. Sm.
 Lupinus vaginans Benth.
 Lupinus valdepallidus C.P.Sm.
 Lupinus vandykeae Eastw.
 Lupinus variegatus A.Heller
 Lupinus variegatus Poir.
 Lupinus varneranus C.P.Sm.
 Lupinus vavilovii Atabekova & Maissurjan
 Lupinus venustus Bailly
 Lupinus violaceus A.Heller
 Lupinus viridicalyx C.P.Sm.
 Lupinus volcanicus Greene
 Lupinus watsonii A.Heller
 Lupinus westiana Small
 Lupinus wolfianus C.P.Sm.
 Lupinus yanlyensis C.P.Sm.
 Lupinus yaruahensis C.P.Sm.

Hybrids
The following hybrids have been described:
 Lupinus ×alpestris (A. Nelson) D.B. Dunn & J.M. Gillett
 Lupinus ×hispanicoluteus W.Święcicki & W.K.Święcicki
 Lupinus ×hybridus Lem.
 Lupinus ×insignis Lem.
 Lupinus ×regalis (auct.) Bergmans—rainbow lupin (Lupinus arboreus × Lupinus polyphyllus)
 Lupinus ×versicolor Caball.

Etymology 
While some sources believe the origin of the name to be in doubt, the Collins Dictionary definition asserts that the word is 14th century in origin, from the Latin lupīnus "wolfish" from lupus "wolf" as it was believed that the plant ravenously exhausted the soil.

Ecology 

Certain species, such as the yellow bush lupin (L. arboreus), are considered invasive weeds when they appear outside their native ranges. In New Zealand, lupines are viewed as invasive and a severe threat in some cases. L. polyphyllus has escaped into the wild and grows in large numbers along main roads and streams on the South Island. A similar spread of the species has occurred in Finland and Norway after the non-native species was first deliberately planted in the landscaping along the main roads. Lupins have been planted in some parts of Australia with a considerably cooler climate, particularly in rural Victoria and New South Wales.

Lupins are important larval food plants for many lepidopterans (butterflies and moths). These include:
 Aricia icarioides missionensis (Mission blue butterfly), larvae limited to Lupinus
 Callophrys irus (frosted elfin), recorded on L. perennis
 Erynnis persius (Persius duskywing)
 †Glaucopsyche xerces (Xerces blue)
 Glaucopsyche lygdamus (silvery blue)
 Plebejus melissa samuelis (Karner blue)
 Erynnis persius persius (eastern Persius duskywing)
 Schinia sueta, larvae limited to Lupinus

Cultivation 
Lupinus polyphyllus, the garden lupin, and Lupinus arboreus, the tree lupin, are popular ornamental plants in gardens, and are the source of numerous hybrids and cultivars in a wide range of colours, including bicolors. As legumes, lupins are good companion plants in gardens, increasing the soil nitrogen for vegetables and other plants. As well as growing in the ground, lupins can do well in pots on balconies or patios.

Agriculture 
In the early 20th century, German scientists attempted to cultivate a sweet variety of lupin lacking the bitter taste, making it more suitable for both human and animal consumption.

Many annual species of lupins are used in agriculture and most of them have Mediterranean origin.
While originally cultivated as a green manure or forage, lupins are increasingly grown for their seeds, which can be used as an alternative to soybeans. Sweet (low alkaloid) lupins are highly regarded as a stock feed, particularly for ruminants, but also for pigs and poultry and more recently as an ingredient in aqua-feeds. The market for lupin seeds for human food is currently small, but researchers believe it has great potential. Lupin seeds are considered "superior" to soybeans in certain applications and evidence is increasing for their potential health benefits. They contain similar protein to soybean, but less fat. As a food source, they are gluten-free and high in dietary fiber, amino acids, and antioxidants, and they are considered to be prebiotic. About 85% of the world's lupin seeds are grown in Western Australia.

Three Mediterranean species of lupin, blue (narrow-leafed) lupin, white lupin, and yellow lupin, are widely cultivated for livestock and poultry feed.

Like other legumes, they can fix nitrogen from the atmosphere into ammonia via a rhizobium–root nodule symbiosis, fertilizing the soil for other plants. This adaptation allows lupins to be tolerant of infertile soils and capable of pioneering change in barren and poor-quality soils. The genus Lupinus is nodulated by Bradyrhizobium soil bacteria.

Toxicity 

Some lupins contain certain secondary compounds, including isoflavones and toxic alkaloids, such as lupinine, anagyrine and sparteine. With early detection, these can be removed through processing, although lupins containing these elements are not usually selected for food-grade products.

A risk of lupin allergy exists in patients allergic to peanuts. Most lupin reactions reported have been in people with peanut allergy. Because of the cross-allergenicity of peanut and lupin, the European Commission, as of 2006, has required that food labels indicate the presence of "lupin and products thereof" in food.

Lupin plants can be colonized by the fungus Diaporthe toxica which can cause a mycotoxicosis known as lupinosis when ingested by grazing animals.

Uses 

Seeds of various species of lupins have been used as a food for over 3,000 years around the Mediterranean and for as long as 6,000 years in the Andes. Lupins were also used by many Native American peoples  of North America such as the Yavapai. Spanish domination led to a change in the eating habits of the indigenous peoples, and only recently (late 20th century onward) has interest in using lupins as a food been renewed.

Lupins can be used to make a variety of foods both sweet and savoury, including everyday meals, traditional fermented foods, baked foods, and sauces. The European white lupin (L. albus) beans are commonly sold in a salty solution in jars (like olives and pickles) and can be eaten with or without the skin. Lupini dishes are most commonly found in Europe, especially in Portugal, Spain, Greece, and Italy. They are also common in Brazil and Egypt. In Portugal, Spain, and the Spanish Harlem district of New York, they are consumed with beer and wine. In Lebanon, Israel, Jordan, Syria, and Palestine the salty and chilled lupini beans are called Turmus and are served as part of an apéritif or a snack. Other species, such as L. albus (white lupin), L. angustifolius (narrow-leafed lupin), and L. hirsutus (blue lupin) also have edible seeds.

Culture 

Consumed throughout the Mediterranean region and the Andean mountains, lupins were eaten by the early Egyptian and pre-Incan people and were known to Roman agriculturalists for their ability to improve the fertility of soils.

In the late 18th century, lupins were introduced into northern Europe as a means of improving soil quality, and by the 1860s, the garden yellow lupin was seen across the sandy soils of the Baltic coastal plain.

The successful development of lupin varieties with the necessary "sweet gene" paved the way for the greater adoption of lupins across Europe and later Australia.

Further work carried out by the Western Australian Department of Agriculture and Food during the 1950s and '60s led to more sweet lupin crops produced in Western Australia now than anywhere else in the world.

Bluebonnets, including the Texas bluebonnet (L. texensis), are the state flowers of Texas.

See also
 Alice Eastwood

Notes

References

Further reading
 Eastwood, R. J., et al. 2008. Diversity and evolutionary history of lupins—insights from new phylogenies. pp. 346–54, In: Palta, J. A. and J. B. Burger. (Eds.) Lupins for Health & Wealth. Proceedings 12th International Lupin Conference, Fremantle, Australia; International Lupin Association, Canterbury, New Zealand.
 Putnam, D. H., et al. Lupine. Alternative Field Crops Manual. University of Minnesota, University of Wisconsin Extension. 1997.
 Zhukovsky, P.M. 1929. A contribution to the knowledge of genus Lupinus Tourn. Bull. Apll. Bot. Gen. Pl.-Breed., Leningrad-Moscow, XXI, I:16-294.
 Kurlovich, B.S. 1989. On the centers of species formation of the genus Lupinus L. (in Russian). Bull.N.I. Vavilov Inst. of plant Industry. Leningrad, 193:20-24. 
 Kurlovich, B.S., Rep’ev, S.I., Shchelko, L.G., Budanova, V.I., Petrova, M.V., Buravtseva, T.V., Stankevich, A.K., Kartuzova, L.T., Alexandrova, T.G., Teplyakova and T.E., Malysh, L.K. 1995. Theoretical basis of plant breeding. Vol.111. The gene bank and breeding of grain legumes (lupine, vetch, soya, and bean), St.Petersburg, VIR, 438p.
 Kurlovich, B.S.(Ed.). 2002. Lupins. Geography, Classification, Genetic Resources and Breeding. "Intan", 468p.

External links

 
 
 Sorting Lupinus Names Multilingual Multiscript Plant Name Database. University of Melbourne.
 Biodiversity of LUPINS
 Hughes, C. Lupinus.
 Lupins.org
 Superhydrophobicity in Lupins - video and commentary.

 
Fabaceae genera
Garden plants
Forages
Nitrogen-fixing crops
Taxa named by Sereno Watson